Caldwell Municipal Airport  is a city-owned, public-use airport located  southwest of the central business district of Caldwell, a city in Burleson County, Texas, United States.

Although most U.S. airports use the same three-letter location identifier for the FAA and IATA, this airport is assigned RWV by the FAA but has no designation from the IATA.

Facilities and aircraft 
For the 12-month period ending March 24, 2006, the airport had 2,700 general aviation aircraft operations, an average of 225 per month.

References

External links 
  at Texas DOT airport directory
 

Airports in Texas
Buildings and structures in Burleson County, Texas
Transportation in Burleson County, Texas